A.X.L. is a 2018 American science fiction adventure film written and directed by Oliver Daly and starring Alex Neustaedter, Becky G, Alex MacNicoll, Dominic Rains, and Thomas Jane. It tells the story of a teenage boy who encounters a robotic dog created from cutting edge military technology. It was released in the United States on August 24, 2018, by Global Road Entertainment. Receiving generally unfavorable reviews from critics and grossing only $8.5 million against its $10 million budget, it was a box office flop.

Plot
A-X-L is a top-secret, robotic dog created by Andric, a Craine Systems scientist, to assist and protect soldiers. The project is funded by the military. Code-named A-X-L ("Attack, eXploration, Logistics") by the scientists who created it, the robot embodies advanced next-generation artificial intelligence. After a trial goes wrong, A-X-L is discovered hiding alone and damaged in the desert by outsider and motorbike racer Miles Hill, himself alone and abandoned by Sam Fontaine after falling from his motorbike during a stunt. Miles and A-X-L connect after the robot's owner-pairing technology is activated. A-X-L goes to great lengths to help and protect his new companion. Becoming himself bonded with A-X-L, Miles teams up with the smart, resourceful Sara Reyes to protect his new best friend.

They go to a remote hideout that Sara uses as an art studio. A-X-L presents Miles with a device which takes a blood sample and completes the pairing process. Sam arrives and confronts Sara, jealous of her relationship with Miles. A-X-L attacks Sam and Miles uses the situation to threaten him, telling him to leave Sara alone. Sara is angry that Miles has inflamed an already bad situation, but says she will not leave Miles. Leaving A-X-L, they go back to Miles' home and tell his father, Chuck, about the robot. Chuck advises them to return it to its owners. Meanwhile, Sam returns with his crew and burns A-X-L with a flamethrower. Sara sees the live recording on her phone and she and Miles take off to save him. They are too late, but A-X-L gives them a location to get him repaired. Meanwhile, a man sent by Andric shows up at Chuck's house and demands to know the location of the device that controls A-X-L. Chuck grows suspicious and outmaneuvers the man, demanding answers to his own questions. The man reveals he is looking for A-X-L.

Miles and Sara take A-X-L to a garage, where the robot begins repairing itself. Andric sees a log of its location and sends a team to retrieve it. The agents arrive and try to retrieve the robot while it is still repairing. The repairs finish just in time, and A-X-L subdues the operatives. As A-X-L reboots, he recalls being burned with a flamethrower, and races off to kill Sam. Miles and Sara rush to stop him. Sam and his friends are partying when A-X-L arrives. Sam tries again to burn him with the flamethrower, but the fuel runs out. Miles and Sara arrive and convince A-X-L not to kill Sam. A swarm of drones arrives and disables A-X-L; Miles and Sara are captured and delivered to Craine Systems. Andric tries to override Miles' control of A-X-L, but fails.

When Miles refuses to reveal where the remote is, Andric programs A-X-L to attack Sara. Sara manages to convince A-X-L not to attack her, by reminding him of how she drew a feather at the hideout. Captain Webber, Andric's military superior, shows up. Andric tries to escape, but is arrested. Knowing they are surrounded, Sara allows herself to be captured. Miles and A-X-L escape, but are pursued by helicopter. They race though hilly terrain until Miles falls from his motorbike. Miles orders A-X-L to run. A-X-L obeys and tries to get as far away as possible before self-destructing, whilst uploading to the Internet all the memories he, Miles and Sara had together. Having finished, A-X-L looks at Miles' image for the last time, and says "Yo! Send it," before finishing the self-destruct sequence. Miles is subdued by the military.

Six weeks later, Andric has been imprisoned for violating national security and endangering the lives of civilians. He is visited by Webber, who informs him that A-X-L's code has resurfaced and wants to know what it is doing. Sara and Miles have gone to college with scholarships provided by the military – to buy their silence and to keep an eye on them. Sara and Miles are spending a day hanging out at the beach, studying and playing with their new puppy, when Sara hands him an envelope. Miles opens it and pulls out a note from his dad saying "This yours?". He flips the envelope upside-down and A-X-L's remote falls out into his hand. He asks Sara if he should press it. The device uploads an A-X-L app onto their phones. They realize that A-X-L has somehow survived and is trying to return to them.

Cast

 Alex Neustaedter as Miles Hill, an aspiring motocross racer.
 Becky G as Sara Reyes, a resourceful girl who Miles allies with.
 Alex MacNicoll as Sam Fontaine
 Dominic Rains as Andric, a scientist at Craine Systems.
 Lou Taylor Pucci as Randall, a scientist at Craine Systems.
 Thomas Jane as Chuck Hill, the father of Miles.
 Patricia de Leon as Joanna Reyes, Sara's mother.
 Niko Guardado as Scroggins
 Marie-Françoise Theodore as Captain Webber
 Ted McGinley as George Fontaine
 Eric Etebari as Craine Operative Berman
 Hassie Harrison as Kirsten/gas station girl

Production
A-X-L is based on the proof-of-concept short film Miles by writer/director Oliver Daly. The short film was funded via Kickstarter campaign that began in 2014, with 190 backers. According to the campaign, the short film is a "movie about blurring the boundaries between humanity and technology, set in the off-roading world of Central California."

Production began in 2015 when writer/director Oliver Daly began reworking his short film Miles into a feature-length film. David S. Goyer joined the project as producer through his Phantom Four banner alongside Kevin Turen. Lakeshore Entertainment joined Phantom Four to produce the film, which began principal photography in 2016. Global Road Entertainment (formerly Open Road) joined Lakeshore Entertainment to co-produce and co-finance the project.

In August 2016, singer Becky G announced that she would be joining the cast as "Sara". Actor Alex MacNicoll (Transparent) was cast in the film in October 2016, joining Alex Neustaedter.

The film was released despite its financing and production company Global Road Entertainment being taken over by its lenders.

Reception

Box office
In the United States and Canada, A.X.L. was released on August 24, 2018 alongside The Happytime Murders, and was projected to gross around $5 million from 1,710 theaters in its opening weekend. It ended up debuting to $2.9 million, finishing ninth at the box office. The film made a total of $8.5 million worldwide.

Critical response
The film received largely negative reviews from critics, with criticisms aimed at its derivative nature. The site's critics' consensus reads, "Clumsily recalling numerous superior movies about unlikely human/robot friendships, A.X.L. is an obsolete adventure made from frequently malfunctioning parts." On Metacritic the film has a weighted average score of 29 out of 100, based on reviews from 7 critics, indicating "generally unfavorable reviews". Audiences polled by CinemaScore gave the film an average grade of "B+" on an A+ to F scale, while PostTrak reported filmgoers gave it a 59% overall positive score.

Katie Rife of The A.V. Club described the film as "utterly forgettable", not believing that anyone would "want to watch [the] utterly generic, sloppily conceived film badly enough to see it in theaters".

References

External links
 
 

2018 films
American robot films
American science fiction action films
American coming-of-age films
American science fiction adventure films
Drone films
2010s children's adventure films
2010s English-language films
Films produced by David S. Goyer
Films set in California
Films shot in Argentina
Films shot in London
Films shot in Los Angeles
Films shot in Melbourne
Films shot in Mexico
2018 science fiction action films
American children's adventure films
American children's drama films
2010s American films